Chris Masten (born 2 May 1989) is an Australian rules footballer and former player for the West Coast Eagles in the Australian Football League (AFL) and was delisted at the end of the 2019 season, after playing a pivotal role in the Eagles premiership in 2018. He was chosen as the first round pick (number 3 overall) in the 2007 AFL Draft by the Eagles, the team he had supported as a child.

Career

Masten showed strong leadership in the 2007 Under-18 championships, captaining Western Australia to win the tournament and on an individual level winning All-Australian honours averaging 25 disposals and five clearances across the 3 games. He was also a graduate of the AIS/AFL Academy in 2006.

He made his senior debut for West Australian Football League (WAFL) team East Fremantle in the round 1 win against South Fremantle, gathering 17 disposals and kicking 3 goals. Masten went on to play 15 games and average 14 disposals per game while also kicking 6 goals for the season.

Masten made his professional debut in round 2 of the 2008 season against . While in his debut match he gathered 11 possessions, he was dropped for the next match against arch-rivals . He returned for the next match against  finishing with 16 possessions, the second highest possession getter for the team in that match, he went to play a further 7 matches of the season including West Coast's win over Adelaide in round 9 of 2008, in that match he also scored his first goal in the AFL before being sent away mid-season to have groin surgery for osteitis pubis.

He returned in 2009 and was awarded an AFL rising star nomination in round 16 against , with a career-high 38 possession game.

In 2012 Masten played in every game and finished seventh in the club's best and fairest award.  He repeated the top 10 finishes for the next two years as he cemented his position in the Eagles midfield.

In August 2015, Masten was found guilty of biting Fremantle player Nick Suban by the AFL tribunal. He was suspended for two matches. It was the first biting case in the AFL since former Eagle Chris Lewis was banned for three matches in 1991.

After 215 games with West Coast, Masten and the club parted ways in September 2019.

Statistics
Statistics are correct to the end of the 2022 season

|- 
! scope="row" style="text-align:center" | 2008
|style="text-align:center;"|
| 13 || 9 || 1 || 4 || 79 || 57 || 136 || 39 || 41 || 0.1 || 0.4 || 8.8 || 6.3 || 15.1 || 4.3 || 4.6 || 2
|-
! scope="row" style="text-align:center" | 2009
|style="text-align:center;"|
| 13 || 19 || 5 || 11 || 175 || 211 || 386 || 39 || 53 || 0.3 || 0.6 || 9.2 || 11.1 || 20.3 || 2.1 || 2.8 || 0
|-  
! scope="row" style="text-align:center" | 2010
|style="text-align:center;"|
| 7 || 13 || 4 || 3 || 87 || 119 || 206 || 35 || 31 || 0.3 || 0.2 || 6.7 || 9.2 || 15.8 || 2.7 || 2.4 || 0
|-
! scope="row" style="text-align:center" | 2011
|style="text-align:center;"|
| 7 || 13 || 7 || 4 || 91 || 99 || 190 || 32 || 42 || 0.5 || 0.3 || 7.0 || 7.6 || 14.6 || 2.5 || 3.2 || 3
|-  
! scope="row" style="text-align:center" | 2012
|style="text-align:center;"|
| 7 || 24 || 20 || 9 || 298 || 223 || 521 || 104 || 78 || 0.8 || 0.4 || 12.4 || 9.3 || 21.7 || 4.3 || 3.3 || 3
|- 
! scope="row" style="text-align:center" | 2013
|style="text-align:center;"|
| 7 || 19 || 9 || 3 || 282 || 218 || 500 || 84 || 74 || 0.5 || 0.2 || 14.8 || 11.5 || 26.3 || 4.4 || 3.9 || 8
|-  
! scope="row" style="text-align:center" | 2014
|style="text-align:center;"|
| 7 || 21 || 5 || 2 || 272 || 207 || 479 || 101 || 76 || 0.2 || 0.1 || 13.0 || 9.9 || 22.8 || 4.8 || 3.6 || 3
|-
! scope="row" style="text-align:center" | 2015
|style="text-align:center;"|
| 7 || 22 || 2 || 11 || 252 || 296 || 548 || 86 || 48 || 0.1 || 0.5 || 11.5 || 13.5 || 24.9 || 3.9 || 2.2 || 5
|-  
! scope="row" style="text-align:center" | 2016
|style="text-align:center;"|
| 7 || 21 || 4 || 4 || 231 || 237 || 468 || 83 || 38 || 0.2 || 0.2 || 11.0 || 11.3 || 22.3 || 4.0 || 1.8 || 0
|-
! scope="row" style="text-align:center" | 2017
|style="text-align:center;"|
| 7 || 13 || 3 || 2 || 126 || 167 || 293 || 55 || 35 || 0.2 || 0.2 || 9.7 || 12.8 || 22.5 || 4.2 || 2.7 || 0
|-  
| scope=row bgcolor=F0E68C | 2018#
|style="text-align:center;"|
| 7 || 24 || 7 || 5 || 274 || 190 || 464 || 140 || 42 || 0.3 || 0.2 || 11.4 || 7.9 || 19.3 || 5.8 || 1.8 || 1
|-
! scope="row" style="text-align:center" | 2019
|style="text-align:center;"|
| 7 || 17 || 3 || 1 || 168 || 114 || 282 || 93 || 30 || 0.2 || 0.1 || 9.9 || 6.7 || 16.6 || 5.5 || 1.8 || 0
|- class="sortbottom"
! colspan=3| Career
! 215 !! 70 !! 59 !! 2335 !! 2138 !! 4473 !! 891 !! 588 !! 0.3 !! 0.3 !! 9.9 !! 10.1 !! 20.8 !! 4.1 !! 2.7 !! 25
|}

Off-field incident
On Australia Day in 2008, Masten was arrested for disorderly conduct after drunkenly punching a man to the ground. Masten pleaded guilty to the disorderly conduct charge and was fined $750 and ordered to pay costs of $110 and received a spent conviction.  Masten was also fined $2000 and suspended by the West Coast Eagles from the pre-season NAB Cup.

References

External links

1989 births
Australian rules footballers from Western Australia
East Fremantle Football Club players
Living people
West Coast Eagles players
West Coast Eagles Premiership players
West Coast Eagles (WAFL) players
East Perth Football Club players
Perth Football Club players
One-time VFL/AFL Premiership players